Edme-François Jomard (1777 – September 22, 1862) was a French cartographer, engineer, and archaeologist. He edited the Description de L'Égypte and was a member of the Institut d'Egypte established by Napoleon. He supervised the educational and cultural mission sent to France from Egypt by Muhammad Ali of Egypt.

Life
He was educated at the collège Mazarin, the École nationale des ponts et chaussées and the École polytechnique. He took part in Napoleon's commission to Egypt. He later worked at the Bibliothèque nationale.

Description de l'Égypte
The publication of the landmark, outsized Description de l'Égypte (Description of Egypt) was decreed by Napoleon Bonaparte in 1802. This seminal publication on Egyptology was a collaboration effort of some 150 prominent French scientist and scholars and 2,000 technicians and artists. It is the record of Bonaparte's Commission des Sciences et des Arts that accompanied the ill-fated French campaign in Egypt and Syria (1798-1801)."

Learned Societies
Jomard was one of the founding members of the Société de Géographie in Paris. With the Irish exile and former American consul David Baillie Warden, Jonard was behind the society's patronage of studies of indigenous America, especially Palenque and the Yucatán Peninsula.

Through his membership of the society, he was also involved in awarding the French explorer, René Caillié, the 10,000 Franc prize for being the first European to return from Timbuktu. He contributed to, and edited, Caillié's account of his travels, Journal d'un voyage à Temboctou et à Jenné dans l'Afrique Centrale, ... which was published in 1830. The work was translated into English and published as  Travels through Central Africa to Timbuctoo; and across the Great Desert, to Morocco,....

Jomard was elected a member of the American Philosophical Society in 1829 and the American Antiquarian Society in 1855.

Jomard Award 
The Jomard Award was established by the Société de Géographie in 1882 for auxiliary sciences and services provided to the French Geographical Society ("Prix pour les sciences auxiliares et pour services rendus á la Société de Géographie").

Recipients 
 1999    The Royal Geographical Society: Archives de la Royal Geographical Society
 2000    Christophe and Oriane Cordonnier: Le Cosmos, d'Alexandre de Humboldt
 2005    Yves Lassus: Jomard, le dernier Egyptien
 2009    Gilles Lapouge: La légende de la géographie

Notes

Sources

1777 births
1862 deaths
French Egyptologists
French archaeologists
Commission des Sciences et des Arts members
Members of the Académie des Inscriptions et Belles-Lettres
Burials at Père Lachaise Cemetery
Members of the American Antiquarian Society
Recipients of the Pour le Mérite (civil class)